Marc Alexandre  (born 30 October 1959) is a retired judoka from France, who represented his native country at two consecutive Summer Olympics (1984 and 1988). He was born in Paris.

Alexandre won the bronze medal in the men's half-lightweight division (– 65 kg), alongside Austria's Josef Reiter, at the 1984 Summer Olympics in Los Angeles, California, followed by the gold medal, four years later in Seoul, South Korea in the lightweight category (– 71 kg) by defeating East Germany's Sven Loll in the final.

Video 
 Video footage of Marc Alexandre (judovision.org)

External links
 
 Judo Legends

1959 births
Living people
French male judoka
Judoka at the 1984 Summer Olympics
Judoka at the 1988 Summer Olympics
Olympic judoka of France
Olympic bronze medalists for France
Olympic gold medalists for France
Sportspeople from Paris
Olympic medalists in judo
Medalists at the 1988 Summer Olympics
Medalists at the 1984 Summer Olympics
20th-century French people
21st-century French people